Christensen , is a Danish (and Norwegian) patronymic surname, literally meaning son of Christen, a sideform of Christian. The spelling variant Kristensen has  identical pronunciation. Christensen is the sixth most common name in Denmark, shared by about 2% of the population. In Norway and Sweden the name can also be spelled Christenson or Kristenson.

The numbers of bearers of the surnames Christensen and Kristensen in Denmark and Norway (2007):

Immigrants to English-speaking countries sometimes have changed the spelling to Christenson or Kristenson.

List of names

Christensen, as a person, may refer to:
Alex Christensen (born 1967), German musician
Alfred Christensen (1905–1974), Danish chess player
Allen Christensen, multiple people
Andreas Christensen (born 1996), Danish footballer 
Andrew Christensen, American psychologist
Anita Christensen (born 1971), Danish professional boxer
Arne Søby Christensen (born 1945), Danish historian
Arthur Christensen (1875–1945), Danish orientalist and historian
Bekim Christensen (born 1973), Danish cycle racer
Benjamin Christensen (1879–1959), Danish actor and director
Bent Christensen Arensøe (born 1967), Danish football player
Bo Christensen (1937–2020), Danish film producer
Brady Christensen (born 1996), American football player
Bruce Christensen (born 1948), American baseball player
Carina Christensen (born 1972), Danish politician
Carl Frederik Albert Christensen (1872–1942), Danish botanist
Carl Christian Anton Christensen (1831–1912), Danish-American artist
Carl C. Christensen (1891–1956), American politician
Carl Peter Hermann Christensen (1869–1936), last executioner in office for the government of Denmark
Carlos Hugo Christensen (1914–1999), Argentina film director and producer
Casper Christensen (born 1968), Danish comedian
Charlie Christensen (born 1958), Swedish cartoonist, best known for the strip Arne Anka 
Christen Christensen (politician) (1826–1900), Norwegian military officer and politician
Christen Christensen (shipowner) (1845–1923), Norwegian ship owner
Clayton Christensen (1952–2020), American business consultant
Cole Christensen, American politician
Conrad Christensen (1882–1951), Norwegian Olympic gymnast
Corine Christensen (1955–1986), American murder victim
Cory Christensen (born 1994), American curler
Cuckoo Christensen, born Walter Niels Christensen (1889–1984), American baseball player
Dan Christensen (1942–2007), American artist
Diana Christensen, fictional character in the film Network (1976)
Don R. Christensen (1916–2006), American animator and cartoonist
Donna Christian-Christensen (born 1945), U. S. Virgin Islands physician, journalist and politician
Eigil Friis-Christensen (1944–2018), Danish physicist
Else Christensen (1913–2005), Danish paganist
Emil Christensen (born 1984), Swedish computer game player
Eric Christensen (disambiguation)
Erik Christensen (born 1983), Canadian ice hockey player
Erika Christensen (born 1982), American actress
Flemming Christensen (born 1958), Danish football player
Frank Christensen (1910–2001), American businessman and college athlete
Frank J. Christensen (born 1961), American Labor Leader
Fred J. Christensen (1921–2006), American fighter pilot and Air Force officer
George Christensen (1909–1968), American football player
George Christensen (born 1978), Australian politician
Hans Christensen (footballer) (1906–1992), Danish footballer
Hans Christensen (silversmith) (1924–1983), Danish-born American silversmith
Harold Christensen (1904–1989), American ballet personality
Hayden Christensen (born 1981), Canadian actor
Heather Christensen (born 1979), American model
Helen Christensen, Australian mental health researcher
Helena Christensen (born 1968), Danish supermodel
Hjalmar Christensen (1869–1925), Norwegian writer
Inger Christensen (1935–2009), Danish writer
Ione Christensen (born 1933), Canadian politician
J. C. Christensen (1856–1930), Danish politician
Jasin J. Christensen (1976-present), American Singer/Songwriter
James C. Christensen (1942–2017), American artist
Jesper Christensen (born 1948), Danish actor

Jim Christensen, Australian Investor and Economist
Joe J. Christensen (1929–2021), American Latter Day Saints general authority and educator
John Christensen (disambiguation), multiple people
Jon Christensen (1943–2020), Norwegian jazz musician
Jon Lynn Christensen (born 1963), American businessman and politician
Jørn Christensen (born 1959), Norwegian music figure
Julie Christensen (born 1956), American singer
Julie Christensen, fictional character in the film Final Destination 3 (2006)
Kaare Christensen (born 1959), Danish epidemiologist
Kayte Christensen (born 1980), American basketball player
Kerry Christensen (born 1954), American yodeler
Kim Christensen (born 1979), Danish football player
Kim Christensen (born 1980), Danish football player
L. Royal Christensen (1915–1997), Lasker Award-winning American microbiologist
Lars Christensen (1884–1965), Norwegian shipowner and whaling magnate
Lars Lindberg Christensen (born 1970), Danish academic
Lars Saabye Christensen (born 1953), Norwegian author
LaVar Christensen (born 1953), American politician
Leif Christensen (1950–1988), Danish musician
Leland Christensen (1959-2022), American politician
Lew Christensen (1909–1984), American ballet personality
Mads Christensen (1856–1929), New Zealand Lutheran pastor from Denmark 
Martin Christensen (born 1987), Danish football player
McKay Christensen (born 1975), American baseball player
Mogens Christensen (1929–2020), Norwegian luger
Morten Christensen (tennis) (born 1955), Danish tennis player
Morten Stig Christensen (born 1958), Danish handball player and sports broadcaster
Mose Christensen (1871–1920), American musician
Niels Christensen (1855–1952), Danish-American inventor
Ole Christensen (born 1955), Danish politician
Ove Christensen (born 1950), Danish football coach
Parley Parker Christensen (1869–1954), American politician
Per Christensen (curling) (born 1955), Danish curler and coach
Pernille Fischer Christensen (born 1969), Danish film director
Peter Christensen (born 1975), Danish politician
Peter Forsyth Christensen (born 1952), Roman Catholic bishop
Phil Christensen (born 1953), American geologist
Reinhardt Kristensen (born 1948), Danish invertebrate biologist
Sophy A. Christensen (1867–1955), Pioneering woman carpenter and furniture designer
Søren Christensen (born 1986), Danish football player
Søren Peter Christensen (1884–1927), Danish Olympic gymnast
Steen Christensen (born 1964), Danish criminal
Theodor Christensen (1905–1988), Schutzstaffel official
Thomas Guldborg Christensen (born 1984), Danish football player
Tim Christensen (born 1974), Danish musician
Todd Christensen (1956–2013), American football player and sports broadcaster
Tonja Christensen (born 1971), American model
Tom Christensen (disambiguation)
Tom Kristensen (disambiguation)
Trevor Christensen (born 1993), American DJ
Ulla Christensen (born 1965), Danish international footballer
Ute Christensen (born 1955), German actress
Villy Christensen, Canadian fisheries scientist
Ward Christensen (born 1945), founder of the first online bulletin board system
Willam Christensen (1902–2001), American ballet personality
Wendy Christensen, fictional character in the film Final Destination 3 (2006)

See also
Christiansen
Christianson
Kristensen
Kristiansen

References

Danish-language surnames
Norwegian-language surnames
Patronymic surnames
Surnames from given names